Pia Kästner (born 29 June 1998 in Eisenhüttenstadt) is a German volleyball player. She participated in the 2018 FIVB Volleyball Women's Nations League.

Career 
Pia Kästner played in her youth league at Eisenhüttenstadt and later at SC Potsdam. From 2013 to 2017, she played with the junior team of VC Olympia Berlin in the second and first Bundesliga, as well as in the junior national team, with them in 2015 at the 2015 FIVB Volleyball Girls' U18 World Championship in Peru, and at the 2016 UEFA European Under-19 Championship in Hungary. In 2017, she played for Allianz MTV Stuttgart.

References

External links 
 https://www.stuttgarts-schoenster-sport.de/team/spielerinnen/pia-kaestner
 http://www.volleyball.world/en/women/teams/ger-germany/players/pia-k%C3%A4stner?id=64232

1998 births
Living people
German women's volleyball players
People from Eisenhüttenstadt
21st-century German women
20th-century German women